The International Ski Federation (FIS) Alpine Ski World Cup, the premier circuit for alpine skiing competition, began in January 1967, and the  season marked the 54th consecutive year for the FIS World Cup. As it had every year since 2006 (when the Sölden races were cancelled by a snowstorm), the season began in Sölden, Austria in October.  The season was supposed to end with the World Cup finals in March, which were to be held in Cortina d'Ampezzo, Italy for the first time since they began in 1993, but the finals were cancelled due to the COVID-19 outbreak in Italy.

As part of an effort to control the expansion of the World Cup circuit while fighting increased specialization, the city events were dropped this season, to be replaced by more parallel events at regular venues, while the Alpine combined was expanded.  Due to the recent dominance of slalom specialists in the Alpine combined races, the format for that discipline was changed this season. As was previously the case, the first run continued to be the speed discipline (with Super-G having the preference over downhill). However, instead of the slalom run starting in reverse order of finish in the speed run, which allowed the slalom specialists (who tended to be slower in the speed run) to tackle fresh snow for their slalom run, while the speed specialists had to face the more challenging rutted snow at the end of the day, the skiers in the slalom run now started in the same order as the finish of the speed run, with the leader after the speed run becoming the first to race on the fresh slalom course.

Parallel format was also changed to make the race more TV-friendly. Parallel races now began with one classic qualification run with a single competitor on the slope (which was shown in the live TV broadcast), after which the top 32 qualifiers by time advanced to the elimination phase of the main competition. The round of 32 used the current run and re-run format, so that each competitor got to start from each side, but from the round of 16 forward, there was only one run per race and a direct knockout system. However, the new format immediately became controversial, as making two giant slalom courses equal in a single-run format proved impossible, and both the first men's and women's parallel giant slalom races suffered from "the luck of the draw" becoming determinative—in the men's race, all eight round-of-16 matches were won by the racer on the same randomly-selected course, and in the women's race, 17 of 20 winners came from the same course.

In addition, a new sixth discipline—parallel events (which combined parallel giant slalom and parallel slalom in points distribution)—was introduced, joining downhill, Super-G, giant slalom, slalom, and combined. A small crystal globe was to be awarded to the winner.

On 1 February 2020, then-women's World Cup overall leader (and 3-time defending champion) Mikaela Shiffrin's father Jeff suffered grave injuries in an accident, and Shiffrin immediately left the World Cup tour.  His injuries proved fatal, and Shiffrin remained off the tour for the rest of the season.

Men
The number of races in the World Cup history

including DH in Kvitfjell (7 March 2020)

Calendar

Rankings

Overall

Downhill

Super-G

Giant slalom

Parallel (2 PG)

Slalom

Alpine combined

Ladies
The number of races in the World Cup history

including SG in La Thuile (29 February 2020)

Calendar

Rankings

Overall

Downhill

Super-G

Giant slalom

Slalom

Alpine combined

Parallel (1 PG + 1 PS)

Alpine team event
World Cup history in real time

including PGS in Soldeu (15 March 2019)

Calendar

Nations Cup

Overall

Men

Ladies

Prize money

Top-5 men

Top-5 ladies

Retirements
The following athletes announced their retirements during or after the season:

Men
 Henri Battilani
 Klaus Brandner
 Robin Buffet
 Dustin Cook
 Fritz Dopfer
 Peter Fill
 Jens Henttinen
 Johannes Kröll
 Wiley Maple
 Marcus Monsen
 André Myhrer
 Matts Olsson
 Manuel Osborne-Paradis
 Stian Saugestad
 Benedikt Staubitzer
 Dominik Stehle
   Elia Zurbriggen

Women

  Christina Ackermann
  Ana Drev
  Michaela Dygruber
  Elena Fanchini
  Nadia Fanchini
  Nina Haver-Løseth
  Veronique Hronek
  Helena Rapaport
  Viktoria Rebensburg
  Johanna Schnarf
  Maren Skjøld
  Ylva Stålnacke
  Anna Veith
  Tina Weirather

Footnotes

References 

 
FIS Alpine Ski World Cup
FIS Alpine Ski World Cup
World Cup
World Cup